Isaac Dubourdieu (c. 1597–1700?), was a French Reformed minister. He left France for England with his two sons.

Biography
Isaac Dubourdieu was a French Protestant minister at Montpellier, who was driven from that place in 1682, and took refuge in London, where he is said by a contemporary author to have "held primary rank" among his fellow pastors, and to have been "wise, laborious, and entirely devoted to the welfare of the refugee church"

In 1684 he published A Discourse of Obedience unto Kings and Magistrates, upon the Anniversary of his Majesties Birth and Restauration, and continued to preach in the Savoy Chapel, of which he was one of the ministers, at least as late as 1692. The exact dates of both his birth and death are uncertain.

Notes

References
.

External links

Attribution
 It cites:
Haag's La France Protestante;
David Carnegie Andrew Agnew, Protestant Exiles from France in the Reign of Louis XIV.

1597 births
1700 deaths
16th-century male writers
17th-century French writers
17th-century French male writers
French Calvinist and Reformed ministers
17th-century Calvinist and Reformed ministers
Huguenots